Jules Banino (16 November 1892 – 12 June 1947) was a French racing cyclist. He rode in the 1921 Tour de France.

References

1892 births
1947 deaths
French male cyclists
Place of birth missing